Rockets EP is an album released by the Long Beach, California band, Boris Smile. The album was released by Count Your Lucky Stars Records in 2010.

Track listing
All songs written by A. Wesley Chung and Boris Smile, except "Satellites" and "Life for Science" written by Seth Shafer.
"Satellites" – 3:00
"Adventures with Rockets (Revisited)" – 4:52
"Apollo" – 3:36
"Aurora" – 5:15
"Are We Alone?" – 2:12
"8.24.06 (The Humbling of a Planet)" – 12:20
Bonus: "Apollo (Acoustic Version)"
Bonus: "Life for Science"

Personnel
A. Wesley Chung: vocals, acoustic guitar, bass drum
Abigail Davidson: vocals, clarinet
Andrew Chen: violin
Ashley Bradford: harmonica
Avi Buffalo: electric guitar, vocals
Beth Balmer: accordion
David Goyette: trombone
Doug Brown: bass, vocals
Evan Trine: drums
Jessica Garcia: cello
Meagan Christy: trumpet
Seth Shafer: piano, tuba, keyboards
Steven Carlson: acoustic guitar

References

2010 albums